Parapediasia decorellus, the graceful grass-veneer, is a moth in the family Crambidae. It was described by Zincken in 1821. It is found in North America, where it has been recorded from Alabama, Arkansas, Florida, Georgia, Illinois, Kansas, Maine, Maryland, Massachusetts, Missouri, New Hampshire, New Jersey, New Mexico, North Carolina, Ohio, Oklahoma, South Carolina, Tennessee and Texas.

References

Crambini
Moths described in 1821
Moths of North America